Basie's in the Bag is an album by pianist and bandleader Count Basie and His Orchestra featuring performances of contemporary popular tunes recorded in 1967 and released on the Brunswick label.

Track listing
 "Mercy, Mercy, Mercy" (Joe Zawinul) - 2:31
 "Hang On Sloopy" (Wes Farrell, Bert Russell) - 2:40
 "Don't Let the Sun Catch You Cryin'"(Joe Greene) - 2:02
 "Ain't Too Proud to Beg" (Norman Whitfield, Edward Holland, Jr.) - 2:10
 "Goin' Out of My Head" (Teddy Randazzo, Bobby Weinstein) - 2:08
 "In the Heat of the Night" (Quincy Jones) - 2:12
 "Green Onions" (Booker T. Jones, Steve Cropper, Lewie Steinberg, Al Jackson, Jr.) - 3:51
 "Knock on Wood" (Eddie Floyd, Cropper) - 1:54
 "Let the Good Times Roll" (Shirley Goodman, Leonard Lee) - 2:15
 "Bright Lights, Big City" (Jimmy Reed) - 2:44
 "Reach Out I'll Be There" (Brian Holland, Lamont Dozier, Eddie Holland) - 2:15
 "Memphis, Tennessee" (Chuck Berry) - 2:32
Recorded in Los Angeles on August 15, 1967 (tracks 1-5, 7, 8 & 10) and August 17, 1967 (tracks 6, 9, 11 & 12)

Personnel 
Count Basie - piano, organ
Al Aarons, Sonny Cohn, Gene Goe, Harry Edison  - trumpet 
Richard Boone, Harlan Floyd, Grover Mitchell - trombone
Bill Hughes - bass trombone
Bobby Plater, Marshal Royal - alto saxophone 
Eddie "Lockjaw" Davis, Eric Dixon - tenor saxophone
Charlie Fowlkes - baritone saxophone
Freddie Green - guitar
Norman Keenan  - bass
Louis Bellson (tracks 2, 5-9, 11 & 12), Irv Cottler (tracks: 1, 3, 4 & 10)  - drums
Chico O'Farrill - arranger

References 

1967 albums
Count Basie Orchestra albums
Brunswick Records albums
Albums produced by Teddy Reig
Albums arranged by Chico O'Farrill